"Candidatus Thorarchaeota", or simply Thorarchaeota, is a phylum within the superphylum Asgard archaea. The Asgard superphylum represents the closest prokaryotic relatives of eukaryotes. Since there is such a close relation between the two different domains, it provides further evidence to the two-domain tree of life theory which states that eukaryotes branched from the archaeal domain. Asgard archaea are single cell marine microbes that contain branch like appendages and have genes that are similar to eukarya. The asgard archaea superphylum is composed of Thorarchaeota, Lokiarchaeota, Odinarchaeota, and Heimdallarchaeota. Thorarchaeota were first identified from the sulfate-methane transition zone in tidewater sediments. Thorarcheota are widely distributed in marine and freshwater sediments.

Discovery 
Thorarchaeota were discovered by analyzing estuary sediments obtained from the White Oak River in North Carolina. Estuaries are brackish bodies of water where fresh and marine water meet, providing a rich and unique area of nutrients. A PhD student at the University of Texas discovered new characteristics of Thorarchaeota that live under sediment and with anoxic properties. The graduate students further proved that the archaea aided in the degradation of organic matter, fixation of inorganic carbon, and the reduction of sulfur. Thorarchaeota genomes that were obtained from the marine appeared to have diversity in metabolic pathways with the potential of degrading and up taking proteins and carbohydrates.

Description
Thorarchaeota have not been cultured in a laboratory. What is known about Thorarchaeota has come from analyzing partial and near complete genomes. 3,029 proteins have been sequenced from the partial genomes. These genomes contain genes that suggest that Thorarchaeota may have the ability to degrade organic matter, suggesting a role in the carbon cycle and an intermediate role in the sulfur cycle. Genes have been found for a near complete Wood-Ljungdahl pathway but lacked the genes for formate dehydrogenase. This could be due to having incomplete genomes. Thorachaeota may use the tetrahydromethanopterin Wood-Ljungdahl pathway to reduce carbon dioxide. Thorarchaeota have genes for protein degradation and assimilation which include the genes clostripain and gingipain. They also have genes for extracellular peptidases. These genes may suggest that the main carbon source for Thorarchaeota is proteins and peptides. Thorarchaeota sequenced partial genomes also have the genes for glycolysis present. They are missing the genes for hexokinases, however they have the genes for pyruvate kinases and phosphoenolpyruvate synthase. The presence of the genes for these enzymes may play a role in the ability to adapt to different environmental conditions. Genes have been found for nitrogen fixation in most samples containing the partial genomes however, no genes for the nitrite reduction catalyzing enzymes have been found. Some of the sequenced partial genomes have near complete Calvin-Benson-Bassham pathways and have been found to use type IV RuBisCO. While other phyla within the Asgard Superphylum use type III and type IV RuBisCO, none have the Calvin-Benson-Bassham pathway.

References

Archaea phyla